The Holocaust is a collaborative studio album by American hip hop production duo Blue Sky Black Death and American rapper The Holocaust. It was released by Babygrande Records in 2006. Due to a fan petition to Babygrande Records, the album's instrumentals were released on June 24, 2008.

Track listing

Personnel
Credits adapted from liner notes.

 The Holocaust – vocals
 Blue Sky Black Death – production, arrangement, recording
 Michael Sarsfield – mastering
 Nubian Image – art direction, design
 Carlos Fuentez – additional illustration
 Austin McManus – photography
 Chuck Wilson – executive production
 Jesse Stone – marketing

References

External links
 

2006 albums
Collaborative albums
Blue Sky Black Death albums
Warcloud albums
Babygrande Records albums